Savigliano may refer to:

 Savigliano, a comune of Piedmont, northern Italy
 Società Nazionale Officine di Savigliano, a former Italian engineering company